Seamless branching is a mechanism used on DVDs and Blu-ray Discs to allow the player to jump to a different scene after finishing one. The most common purpose is to have several versions of a scene within one film, without having to store the entire film on the disc several times.

A popular example is the Platinum Edition DVD of The Lion King, where the user can select between the original theatrical version and an extended version. The two versions differ only in one scene (the "morning report"). The DVD player is instructed to play the film normally up to this scene, then jump to the appropriate scene as selected by the user before the commencement of the film, and then jump back to play the rest of the film. The user normally does not notice this jump, hence the word seamless. Larger scale examples of the same technique are seen in the 2000 Ultimate Edition DVD of Terminator 2: Judgment Day, the 2007 DVD rerelease of Blade Runner and the Platinum and Diamond Edition DVDs of Beauty and the Beast in which three different cuts of the films are playable from the same discs.

Another possible use of seamless branching is for the localisation (translation) of on-screen visible text. The Star Wars DVDs with their opening crawl are a prime example. Normally, only the audio track of films is translated into other languages, but when text central to the plot is visible on-screen, the scene may be created once for every language, and the DVD player can be instructed to select the appropriate version of the scene depending on the user's language preference. However, for this purpose a technique called multi-angle is used more often.

See also 
 DVD

DVD
Blu-ray Disc